Teksevatnet is a lake located on the border of the municipalities of Eigersund and Lund in Rogaland county, Norway.

See also
List of lakes in Norway

References

Lakes of Rogaland
Lund, Norway
Eigersund